Aniyathi may refer to:
 Aniyathi (film), a 1955 Indian Malayalam film
 Aniyathi (TV series), an Indian television series